Ahmed Aden ducale nicknamed Riwaayo is a Somaliland politician, and the current Mayor of Burao, the capital and the largest city of Togdheer region of Somaliland since 20 June 2021. He succeeded Mohamed Yusuf Abdirahman on 20 June 2021 after the 2021 Somaliland municipal elections.

See also 

 Burao

References 

Living people
Year of birth missing (living people)
Justice and Welfare Party politicians
People from Burao